Blonde Comet is a 1941 racing movie directed by William Beaudine and starring Virginia Vale as a female racing driver who competes all over Europe then returns to America where she finds romance with a male driver (Robert Kent) against whom she races.  Race driver Barney Oldfield plays himself in a large role billed third under Vale and Kent.

Cast
Virginia Vale - Beverly Blake
Robert Kent - Jim Flynn
Barney Oldfield - Himself
Vince Barnett - Curly
William Halligan - Cannonball Blake
Joey Ray - Red Stewart
Red Knight - Tex
Diana Hughes - Jennie

References

External links
 Blonde Comet in the Internet Movie Database
 

1941 films
American auto racing films
Films directed by William Beaudine
1940s sports films
Producers Releasing Corporation films
American black-and-white films
1940s English-language films
1940s American films